A botanical garden or botanic garden is a garden with a documented collection of living plants for the purpose of scientific research, conservation, display, and education. Typically plants are labelled with their botanical names. It may contain specialist plant collections such as cacti and other succulent plants, herb gardens, plants from particular parts of the world, and so on; there may be greenhouses, shadehouses, again with special collections such as tropical plants, alpine plants, or other exotic plants. Most are at least partly open to the public, and may offer guided tours, educational displays, art exhibitions, book rooms, open-air theatrical and musical performances, and other entertainment.

Botanical gardens are often run by universities or other scientific research organizations, and often have associated herbaria and research programmes in plant taxonomy or some other aspect of botanical science. In principle, their role is to maintain documented collections of living plants for the purposes of scientific research, conservation, display, and education, although this will depend on the resources available and the special interests pursued at each particular garden.  The staff will normally include botanists as well as gardeners.

The origin of modern botanical gardens is generally traced to the appointment of professors of botany to the medical faculties of universities in 16th century Renaissance Italy, which also entailed the curation of a medicinal garden. However, the objectives, content, and audience of today's botanic gardens more closely resembles that of the grandiose gardens of antiquity and the educational garden of Theophrastus in the Lyceum of ancient Athens.

The early concern with medicinal plants changed in the 17th century to an interest in the new plant imports from explorations outside Europe as botany gradually established its independence from medicine. In the 18th century, systems of nomenclature and classification were devised by botanists working in the herbaria and universities associated with the gardens, these systems often being displayed in the gardens as educational "order beds". With the rapid expansion of European colonies around the globe in the late 18th century, botanic gardens were established in the tropics, and economic botany became a focus with the hub at the Royal Botanic Gardens, Kew, near London.

Over the years, botanical gardens, as cultural and scientific organisations, have responded to the interests of botany and horticulture. Nowadays, most botanical gardens display a mix of the themes mentioned and more; having a strong connection with the general public, there is the opportunity to provide visitors with information relating to the environmental issues being faced at the start of the 21st century, especially those relating to plant conservation and sustainability.

Definitions

The term tends to be used somewhat differently in different parts of the world. For example a large woodland garden with a good collection of rhododendron and other flowering tree and shrub species is very likely to present itself as a "botanical garden" if it is located in the US, but very unlikely to do so if in the UK (unless it also contains other relevant features).  Very few of the sites used for the UK's dispersed National Plant Collection, usually holding large collections of a particular taxonomic group, would call themselves "botanic gardens".

The "New Royal Horticultural Society Dictionary of Gardening" (1999) points out that among the various kinds of organisations known as botanical gardens are many that are in modern times public gardens with little scientific activity, and it cited a tighter definition published by the World Wildlife Fund and IUCN when launching the ’'Botanic Gardens Conservation Strategy'’ in 1989: "A botanic garden is a garden containing scientifically ordered and maintained collections of plants, usually documented and labelled, and open to the public for the purposes of recreation, education and research." This has been further reduced by Botanic Gardens Conservation International to the following definition which "encompasses the spirit of a true botanic garden": "A botanic garden is an institution holding documented collections of living plants for the purposes of scientific research, conservation, display and education."

The following definition was produced by staff of the Liberty Hyde Bailey Hortorium of Cornell University in 1976. It covers in some detail the many functions and activities generally associated with botanical gardens:
A botanical garden is a controlled and staffed institution for the maintenance of a living collection of plants under scientific management for purposes of education and research, together with such libraries, herbaria, laboratories, and museums as are essential to its particular undertakings. Each botanical garden naturally develops its own special fields of interests depending on its personnel, location, extent, available funds, and the terms of its charter. It may include greenhouses, test grounds, an herbarium, an arboretum, and other departments. It maintains a scientific as well as a plant-growing staff, and publication is one of its major modes of expression.

This broad outline is then expanded:
The botanic garden may be an independent institution, a governmental operation, or affiliated to a college or university. If a department of an educational institution, it may be related to a teaching program. In any case, it exists for scientific ends and is not to be restricted or diverted by other demands. It is not merely a landscaped or ornamental garden, although it may be artistic, nor is it an experiment station or yet a park with labels on the plants. The essential element is the intention of the enterprise, which is the acquisition and dissemination of botanical knowledge.

A contemporary botanic garden is a strictly protected natural urban green area, where a managing organization creates landscaped gardens and holds documented collections of living plants and/or preserved plant accessions containing functional units of heredity of actual or potential value for purposes such as scientific research, education, public display, conservation, sustainable use, tourism and recreational activities, production of marketable plant-based products and services for improvement of human well-being.

The botanical gardens network

Worldwide, there are now about 1800 botanical gardens and arboreta in about 150 countries (mostly in temperate regions) of which about 550 are in Europe (150 of which are in Russia), 200 in North America, and an increasing number in East Asia. These gardens attract about 300 million visitors a year.

Historically, botanical gardens exchanged plants through the publication of seed lists (these were called  in the 18th century). This was a means of transferring both plants and information between botanical gardens. This system continues today, although the possibility of genetic piracy and the transmission of invasive species has received greater attention in recent times.

The International Association of Botanic Gardens was formed in 1954 as a worldwide organisation affiliated to the International Union of Biological Sciences. More recently, coordination has also been provided by Botanic Gardens Conservation International (BGCI), which has the mission "To mobilise botanic gardens and engage partners in securing plant diversity for the well-being of people and the planet". BGCI has over 700 membersmostly botanic gardensin 118 countries, and strongly supports the Global Strategy for Plant Conservation by producing a range resources and publications, and by organizing international conferences and conservation programs.

Communication also happens regionally. In the United States, there is the American Public Gardens Association (formerly the American Association of Botanic Gardens and Arboreta), and in Australasia there is the Botanic Gardens of Australia and New Zealand (BGANZ).

History and development

The history of botanical gardens is closely linked to the history of botany itself. The botanical gardens of the 16th and 17th centuries were medicinal gardens, but the idea of a botanical garden changed to encompass displays of the beautiful, strange, new and sometimes economically important plant trophies being returned from the European colonies and other distant lands. Later, in the 18th century, they became more educational in function, demonstrating the latest plant classification systems devised by botanists working in the associated herbaria as they tried to order these new treasures. Then, in the 19th and 20th centuries, the trend was towards a combination of specialist and eclectic collections demonstrating many aspects of both horticulture and botany.

Precursors
The idea of "scientific" gardens used specifically for the study of plants dates back to antiquity.

Grand gardens of ancient history

Near-eastern royal gardens set aside for economic use or display and containing at least some plants gained by special collecting trips or military campaigns abroad, are known from the second millennium BCE in ancient Egypt, Mesopotamia, Crete, Mexico and China. In about 2800 BCE, the Chinese Emperor Shen Nung sent collectors to distant regions searching for plants with economic or medicinal value. It has also been suggested that the Spanish colonization of Mesoamerica influenced the history of the botanical garden as gardens in Tenochtitlan established by king Nezahualcoyotl, also gardens in Chalco (altépetl) and elsewhere, greatly impressed the Spanish invaders, not only with their appearance, but also because the indigenous Aztecs employed many more medicinal plants than did the classical world of Europe.

Early medieval gardens in Islamic Spain resembled botanic gardens of the future, an example being the 11th-century Huerta del Ray garden of physician and author Ibn Wafid (999–1075 CE) in Toledo. This was later taken over by garden chronicler Ibn Bassal (fl. 1085 CE) until the Christian conquest in 1085 CE. Ibn Bassal then founded a garden in Seville, most of its plants being collected on a botanical expedition that included Morocco, Persia, Sicily, and Egypt. The medical school of Montpelier was also founded by Spanish Arab physicians, and by 1250 CE, it included a physic garden, but the site was not given botanic garden status until 1593.

Physic gardens
Botanical gardens, in the modern sense, developed from physic gardens, whose main purpose was to cultivate herbs for medical use as well as research and experimentation. Such gardens have a long history. In Europe, for example, Aristotle (384 BCE – 322 BCE) is said to have had a physic garden in the Lyceum at Athens, which was used for educational purposes and for the study of botany, and this was inherited, or possibly set up, by his pupil Theophrastus, the "Father of Botany". There is some debate among science historians whether this garden was ordered and scientific enough to be considered "botanical", and suggest it more appropriate to attribute the earliest known botanical garden in Europe to the botanist and pharmacologist Antonius Castor, mentioned by Pliny the Elder in the 1st century.

Though these ancient gardens shared some of the characteristics of present-day botanical gardens, the forerunners of modern botanical gardens are generally regarded as being the medieval monastic physic gardens that originated after the decline of the Roman Empire at the time of Emperor Charlemagne (742–789 CE). These gardens were probably given impetus when Charlemagne issued a capitulary, the Capitulary de Villis, which listed 73 herbs to be used in the physic gardens of his dominions. Many of these were found in British gardens even though they only occurred naturally in continental Europe, demonstrating earlier plant introduction. Pope Nicholas V set aside part of the Vatican grounds in 1447, for a garden of medicinal plants that were used to promote the teaching of botany, and this was a forerunner to the University gardens at Padua and Pisa established in the 1540s. Certainly the founding of many early botanic gardens was instigated by members of the medical profession.

16th- and 17th-century European gardens

In the 17th century, botanical gardens began their contribution to a deeper scientific curiosity about plants. If a botanical garden is defined by its scientific or academic connection, then the first true botanical gardens were established with the revival of learning that occurred in the European Renaissance. These were secular gardens attached to universities and medical schools, used as resources for teaching and research. The superintendents of these gardens were often professors of botany with international reputations, a factor that probably contributed to the creation of botany as an independent discipline rather than a descriptive adjunct to medicine.

Origins in the Italian Renaissance
The botanical gardens of Southern Europe were associated with university faculties of medicine and were founded in Italy at Orto botanico di Pisa (1544), Orto botanico di Padova (1545), Orto Botanico di Firenze (1545), Orto Botanico dell'Università di Pavia (1558) and Orto Botanico dell'Università di Bologna (1568). Here the physicians (referred to in English as apothecaries) delivered lectures on the Mediterranean "simples" or "officinals" that were being cultivated in the grounds. Student education was no doubt stimulated by the relatively recent advent of printing and the publication of the first herbals. All of these botanical gardens still exist, mostly in their original locations.

Northern Europe
The tradition of these Italian gardens passed into Spain Botanical Garden of Valencia, 1567) and Northern Europe, where similar gardens were established in the Netherlands (Hortus Botanicus Leiden, 1590; Hortus Botanicus (Amsterdam), 1638), Germany (Alter Botanischer Garten Tübingen, 1535; Leipzig Botanical Garden, 1580; Botanischer Garten Jena, 1586; Botanischer Garten Heidelberg, 1593; Herrenhäuser Gärten, Hanover, 1666; Botanischer Garten der Christian-Albrechts-Universität zu Kiel, 1669; Botanical Garden in Berlin, 1672), Switzerland (Old Botanical Garden, Zürich, 1560; Basel, 1589); England (University of Oxford Botanic Garden, 1621; Chelsea Physic Garden, 1673); Scotland (Royal Botanic Garden Edinburgh, 1670); and in France (Jardin des plantes de Montpellier, 1593; Faculty of Medicine Garden, Paris, 1597; Jardin des Plantes, Paris, 1635), Denmark (University of Copenhagen Botanical Garden, 1600); Sweden (Uppsala University, 1655).

Beginnings of botanical science

During the 16th and 17th centuries, the first plants were being imported to these major Western European gardens from Eastern Europe and nearby Asia (which provided many bulbs), and these found a place in the new gardens, where they could be conveniently studied by the plant experts of the day. For example, Asian introductions were described by Carolus Clusius (1526–1609), who was director, in turn, of the Botanical Garden of the University of Vienna and Hortus Botanicus Leiden. Many plants were being collected from the Near East, especially bulbous plants from Turkey. Clusius laid the foundations of Dutch tulip breeding and the bulb industry, and he helped create one of the earliest formal botanical gardens of Europe at Leyden where his detailed planting lists have made it possible to recreate this garden near its original site. His Exoticorum libri decem (1605) is an important survey of exotic plants and animals that is still consulted today. The inclusion of new plant introductions in botanic gardens meant their scientific role was now widening, as botany gradually asserted its independence from medicine.

In the mid to late 17th century, the Paris Jardin des Plantes was a centre of interest with the greatest number of new introductions to attract the public. In England, the Chelsea Physic Garden was founded in 1673 as the "Garden of the Society of Apothecaries". The Chelsea garden had heated greenhouses, and in 1723 appointed Philip Miller (1691–1771) as head gardener. He had a wide influence on both botany and horticulture, as plants poured into it from around the world. The garden's golden age came in the 18th century, when it became the world's most richly stocked botanical garden. Its seed-exchange programme was established in 1682 and still continues today.

18th century

With the increase in maritime trade, ever more plants were being brought back to Europe as trophies from distant lands, and these were triumphantly displayed in the private estates of the wealthy, in commercial nurseries, and in the public botanical gardens. Heated conservatories called "orangeries", such as the one at Kew, became a feature of many botanical gardens. Industrial expansion in Europe and North America resulted in new building skills, so plants sensitive to cold were kept over winter in progressively elaborate and expensive heated conservatories and glasshouses.

The Cape, Dutch East Indies
The 18th century was marked by introductions from the Cape of South Africaincluding ericas, geraniums, pelargoniums, succulents, and proteaceous plantswhile the Dutch trade with the Dutch East Indies resulted in a golden era for the Leiden and Amsterdam botanical gardens and a boom in the construction of conservatories.

Royal Botanic Gardens, Kew

The Royal Gardens at Kew were founded in 1759, initially as part of the Royal Garden set aside as a physic garden. William Aiton (1741–1793), the first curator, was taught by garden chronicler Philip Miller of the Chelsea Physic Garden whose son Charles became first curator of the original Cambridge Botanic Garden (1762). In 1759, the "Physick Garden" was planted, and by 1767, it was claimed that "the Exotick Garden is by far the richest in Europe". Gardens such as the Royal Botanic Gardens, Kew (1759) and Orotava Acclimatization Garden , Tenerife (1788) and the Real Jardín Botánico de Madrid (1755) were set up to cultivate new species returned from expeditions to the tropics; they also helped found new tropical botanical gardens. From the 1770s, following the example of the French and Spanish, amateur collectors were supplemented by official horticultural and botanical plant hunters. These botanical gardens were boosted by the flora being sent back to Europe from various European colonies around the globe.

At this time, British horticulturalists were importing many woody plants from Britain's colonies in North America, and the popularity of horticulture had increased enormously, encouraged by the horticultural and botanical collecting expeditions overseas fostered by the directorship of Sir William Jackson Hooker and his keen interest in economic botany. At the end of the 18th century, Kew, under the directorship of Sir Joseph Banks, enjoyed a golden age of plant hunting, sending out collectors to the South African Cape, Australia, Chile, China, Ceylon, Brazil, and elsewhere, and acting as "the great botanical exchange house of the British Empire". From its earliest days to the present, Kew has in many ways exemplified botanic garden ideals, and is respected worldwide for the published work of its scientists, the education of horticultural students, its public programmes, and the scientific underpinning of its horticulture.

Bartram's Garden
In 1728, John Bartram founded Bartram's Garden in Philadelphia, one of the continent's first botanical gardens. The garden is now managed as a historical site that includes a few original and many modern specimens as well as extensive archives and restored historical farm buildings.

Plant classification

The large number of plants needing description were often listed in garden catalogues; and at this time Carl Linnaeus established the system of binomial nomenclature which greatly facilitated the listing process. Botanical gardens had now become scientific collections, as botanists published their descriptions of the new exotic plants, and these were also recorded for posterity in detail by superb botanical illustrations. In this century, botanical gardens effectively dropped their medicinal function in favour of scientific and aesthetic priorities, and the term "botanic garden" came to be more closely associated with the herbarium, library (and later laboratories) housed there than with the living collectionson which little research was undertaken.

19th century

The late 18th and early 19th centuries were marked by the establishment of tropical botanical gardens as a tool of colonial expansion (for trade and commerce and, secondarily, science) mainly by the British and Dutch, in India, South-east Asia and the Caribbean. This was also the time of Sir Joseph Banks's botanical collections during Captain James Cook's circumnavigations of the planet and his explorations of Oceania, which formed the last phase of plant introduction on a grand scale.

Tropical botanical gardens
There are currently about 230 tropical botanical gardens with a concentration in southern and south-eastern Asia. The first botanical garden founded in the tropics was the Pamplemousses Botanical Garden in Mauritius, established in 1735 to provide food for ships using the port, but later trialling and distributing many plants of economic importance. This was followed by the West Indies (Botanic Gardens St. Vincent, 1764) and in 1786 by the Acharya Jagadish Chandra Bose Botanical Garden in Calcutta, India founded during a period of prosperity when the city was a trading centre for the Dutch East India Company. Other gardens were constructed in Brazil (Rio de Janeiro Botanical Garden, 1808), Sri Lanka (Botanical Garden of Peradeniya, 1821 and on a site dating back to 1371), Indonesia (Bogor Botanical Gardens, 1817 and Kebun Raya Cibodas, 1852), and Singapore (Singapore Botanical Gardens, 1822). These had a profound effect on the economy of the countries, especially in relation to the foods and medicines introduced. The importation of rubber trees to the Singapore Botanic Garden initiated the important rubber industry of the Malay Peninsula. At this time also, teak and tea were introduced to India and breadfruit, pepper and starfruit to the Caribbean.

Included in the charter of these gardens was the investigation of the local flora for its economic potential to both the colonists and the local people. Many crop plants were introduced by or through these gardensoften in association with European botanical gardens such as Kew or Amsterdamand included cloves, tea, coffee, breadfruit, cinchona, sugar, cotton, palm oil and Theobroma cacao (for chocolate). During these times, the rubber plant was introduced to Singapore. Especially in the tropics, the larger gardens were frequently associated with a herbarium and museum of economy. The Botanical Garden of Peradeniya had considerable influence on the development of agriculture in Ceylon where the Para rubber tree was introduced from Kew, which had itself imported the plant from South America. Other examples include cotton from the Chelsea Physic Garden to the Province of Georgia in 1732 and tea into India by Calcutta Botanic Garden. The transfer of germplasm between the temperate and tropical botanical gardens was undoubtedly responsible for the range of agricultural crops currently used in several regions of the tropics.

Australia

The first botanical gardens in Australia were founded early in the 19th century. The Royal Botanic Gardens, Sydney, 1816; the Royal Tasmanian Botanical Gardens, 1818; the Royal Botanic Gardens, Melbourne, 1845; Adelaide Botanic Gardens, 1854; and Brisbane Botanic Gardens, 1855. These were established essentially as colonial gardens of economic botany and acclimatisation. The Auburn Botanical Gardens, 1977, located in Sydney's western suburbs, are one of the popular and diverse botanical gardens in the Greater Western Sydney area.

New Zealand
Major botanical gardens in New Zealand include Dunedin Botanic Gardens, 1863; Christchurch Botanic Gardens, 1863; and Wellington Botanic Gardens, 1868.

Hong Kong
Hong Kong Botanic Gardens, 1871 (renamed Hong Kong Zoological and Botanical Gardens in 1975), up from the Government Hill in Victoria City, Hong Kong Island.

Japan
The Koishikawa Botanical Garden in Tokyo, with its origin going back to the Tokugawa shogunate's ownership, became in 1877 part of the Tokyo Imperial University.

Sri Lanka
In Sri Lanka major botanical gardens include the Royal Botanical Gardens, Peradeniya (formally established in 1843), Hakgala Botanical Gardens (1861) and Henarathgoda Botanical Garden (1876).

Ecuador 

Jardín Botánico de Quito is inside the Parque La Carolina is a 165.5-acre (670,000 m2) park in the centre of the Quito central business district, bordered by the avenues Río Amazonas, de los Shyris, Naciones Unidas, Eloy Alfaro, and de la República.

The botanical garden of Quito is a park, a botanical garden, an arboretum and greenhouses of 18,600 square meters that is planned to increase, maintain the plants of the country (Ecuador is among the 17 richest countries in the world in the native species, a study on this matter). The Ecuadorian flora classified, determines the existence of 17,000 species)

Egypt 
The Orman Garden, one of the most famous botanical gardens in Egypt, is located at Giza, in Cairo, and dates back to 1875.

South Africa

South Africa has ten national level botanical gardens all of which are overseen by the South African National Biodiversity Institute (SANBI).

The oldest botanical garden in South Africa is the Durban Botanic Gardens which has been located on the same site since 1851. The Kirstenbosch National Botanical Garden is the most famous and developed garden in the country, established in 1913 on a site dating to 1848 and covering a 36 hectare area with an additional 528 hectares of mountainside wilderness that form part of the garden. Stellenbosch University Botanical Garden is the oldest university botanical garden in South Africa, and was established in 1922. Other botanical gardens in country include the Walter Sisulu National Botanical Garden, Harold Porter National Botanical Gardens and Karoo Desert National Botanical Garden. Some smaller gardens and parks that verge on being a botanical garden includes the Arderne Gardens in Cape Town founded in 1845.

United States

The first botanical garden in the United States, Bartram's Garden, was founded in 1730 near Philadelphia, and in the same year, the Linnaean Botanic Garden at Philadelphia itself. Presidents George Washington, Thomas Jefferson and James Madison, all experienced farmers, shared the dream of a national botanic garden for the collection, preservation and study of plants from around the world to contribute to the welfare of the American people paving the way for establishing the US Botanic Garden, right outside the nation's Capitol in Washington DC in 1820. In 1859, the Missouri Botanical Garden was founded at St Louis; it is now one of the world's leading gardens specializing in tropical plants. This was one of several popular American gardens, including Longwood Gardens (1798), Arnold Arboretum (1872), New York Botanical Garden (1891), Huntington Botanical Gardens (1906), Brooklyn Botanic Garden (1910), International Peace Garden (1932), and Fairchild Tropical Botanic Garden (1938). US tax code provides for a substantial benefit to botanical gardens, this has led to a large number of entities declaring their campuses a botanical garden with little regard for veracity.

Russia

Russia has more gardens describing themselves as botanical gardens than any other country. Better-known gardens are Moscow University Botanic Garden ('the Apothecary Garden'), (1706), Saint Petersburg Botanical Garden, (1714); and Moscow Botanical Garden of Academy of Sciences, (1945).

These gardens are notable for their structures that include sculptures, pavilions, bandstands, memorials, shadehouses, tea houses and such.

Among the smaller gardens within Russia, one that is increasingly gaining prominence, is the Botanical Garden of Tver State University (1879) – the northernmost botanical Garden with an exhibition of steppe plants, only one of its kind in the Upper Volga.

Ukraine
Ukraine has about 30 botanical gardens. The most famous from them with well-respected collections are Nikitsky Botanical Garden, Yalta, founded in 1812, M.M. Gryshko National Botanical Garden, a botanical garden of the National Academy of Sciences of Ukraine founded in 1936, and A.V. Fomin Botanical Garden of the Taras Shevchenko National University of Kyiv founded in 1839, which are located in Kyiv, the capital of Ukraine.

20th century

Civic and municipal botanical gardens
A large number of civic or municipal botanical gardens were founded in the 19th and 20th centuries. These did not develop scientific facilities or programmes, but the horticultural aspects were strong and the plants often labelled. They were botanical gardens in the sense of building up collections of plants and exchanging seeds with other gardens around the world, although their collection policies were determined by those in day-to-day charge of them. They tended to become little more than beautifully maintained parks and were, indeed, often under general parks administrations.

Community engagement
The second half of the 20th century saw increasingly sophisticated educational, visitor service, and interpretation services. Botanical gardens started to cater for many interests and their displays reflected this, often including botanical exhibits on themes of evolution, ecology or taxonomy, horticultural displays of attractive flowerbeds and herbaceous borders, plants from different parts of the world, special collections of plant groups such as bamboos or roses, and specialist glasshouse collections such as tropical plants, alpine plants, cacti and orchids, as well as the traditional herb gardens and medicinal plants. Specialised gardens like the Palmengarten in Frankfurt, Germany (1869), one of the world's leading orchid and succulent plant collections, have been very popular. There was a renewed interest in gardens of indigenous plants and areas dedicated to natural vegetation.

With decreasing financial support from governments, revenue-raising public entertainment increased, including music, art exhibitions, special botanical exhibitions, theatre and film, this being supplemented by the advent of "Friends" organisations and the use of volunteer guides.

Plant conservation
Plant conservation and the heritage value of exceptional historic landscapes were treated with a growing sense of urgency. Specialist gardens were sometimes given a separate or adjoining site, to display native and indigenous plants.

In the 1970s, gardens became focused on plant conservation. The Botanic Gardens Conservation Secretariat was established by the IUCN, and the World Conservation Union in 1987 with the aim of coordinating the plant conservation efforts of botanical gardens around the world. It maintains a database of rare and endangered species in botanical gardens' living collections. Many gardens hold ex situ conservation collections that preserve genetic variation. These may be held as seeds dried and stored at low temperature, or in tissue culture (such as the Kew Millennium Seedbank); as living plants, including those that are of special horticultural, historical or scientific interest (such as those in the National Plant Collection in the United Kingdom); or by managing and preserving areas of natural vegetation. Collections are often held and cultivated with the intention of reintroduction to their original habitats. The Center for Plant Conservation at St Louis, Missouri, coordinates the conservation of native North American species.

Role and functions

Many of the functions of botanical gardens have already been discussed in the sections above, which emphasise the scientific underpinning of botanical gardens with their focus on research, education and conservation. However, as multifaceted organisations, all sites have their own special interests. In a remarkable paper on the role of botanical gardens, Ferdinand von Mueller (1825–1896), the director of the Royal Botanic Gardens, Melbourne (1852–1873), stated, "in all cases the objects [of a botanical garden] must be mainly scientific and predominantly instructive". He then detailed many of the objectives being pursued by the world's botanical gardens in the middle of the 19th century, when European gardens were at their height. Many of these are listed below to give a sense of the scope of botanical gardens' activities at that time, and the ways in which they differed from parks or what he called "public pleasure gardens":

 availability of plants for scientific research
 display of plant diversity in form and use
 display of plants of particular regions (including local)
 plants sometimes grown within their particular families
 plants grown for their seed or rarity
 major timber (American English: lumber) trees
 plants of economic significance
 glasshouse plants of different climates
 all plants accurately labelled
 records kept of plants and their performance
 catalogues of holdings published periodically

 research facilities utilising the living collections
 studies in plant taxonomy
 examples of different vegetation types
 student education
 a herbarium
 selection and introduction of ornamental and other plants to commerce
 studies of plant chemistry (phytochemistry)
 report on the effects of plants on livestock
 at least one collector maintained doing field work

Botanical gardens must find a compromise between the need for peace and seclusion, while at the same time satisfying the public need for information and visitor services that include restaurants, information centres and sales areas that bring with them rubbish, noise, and hyperactivity. Attractive landscaping and planting design sometimes compete with scientific interests — with science now often taking second place. Some gardens are now heritage landscapes that are subject to constant demand for new exhibits and exemplary environmental management.

Many gardens now have plant shops selling flowers, herbs, and vegetable seedlings suitable for transplanting; many, like the UBC Botanical Garden and Centre for Plant Research and the Chicago Botanic Garden, have plant-breeding programs and introduce new plants to the horticultural trade.

Future

Botanical gardens are still being built, such as the first botanical garden in Oman, which will be one of the largest gardens in the world. Once completed, it will house the first large-scale cloud forest in a huge glasshouse. Development of botanical gardens in China over recent years has been remarkable, including the Hainan Botanical Garden of Tropical Economic Plants South China Botanical Garden at Guangzhou, the Xishuangbanna Botanical Garden of Tropical Plants and the Xiamen Botanic Garden, but in developed countries, many have closed for lack of financial support, this being especially true of botanical gardens attached to universities.

Botanical gardens have always responded to the interests and values of the day. If a single function were to be chosen from the early literature on botanical gardens, it would be their scientific endeavour and, flowing from this, their instructional value. In their formative years, botanical gardens were gardens for physicians and botanists, but then they progressively became more associated with ornamental horticulture and the needs of the general public. The scientific reputation of a botanical garden is now judged by the publications coming out of herbaria and similar facilities, not by its living collections. The interest in economic plants now has less relevance, and the concern with plant classification systems has all but disappeared, while a fascination with the curious, beautiful and new seems unlikely to diminish.

In recent times, the focus has been on creating an awareness of the threat to the Earth's ecosystems from human populations and its consequent need for biological and physical resources. Botanical gardens provide an excellent medium for communication between the world of botanical science and the general public. Education programs can help the public develop greater environmental awareness by understanding the meaning and importance of ideas like conservation and sustainability.

Photo gallery

Maps 

BGCI garden ID, Botanical gardens, Europe

See also

 Herb farm
 List of botanical gardens
 List of botanical gardens in Canada
 List of botanical gardens in the United States
 List of botanical gardens in the United Kingdom
 Plant collecting
 PlantCollections (a database)
 National Public Gardens Day
 Botanical and horticultural library
 List of botanical gardens in Australia

Footnotes

References

Bibliography

 
 
 
 
 
 
 
 
 
 
 
 
 
 
 
 Klemun, Marianne, The Botanical Garden, EGO - European History Online, Mainz: Institute of European History, 2019, retrieved: March 8, 2021 (pdf).

External links

 
Science museums
Botany
Biorepositories